Samira Amirova (born 2 April 1998) is an Uzbekistani rhythmic gymnast. She competed in the group rhythmic gymnastics competition at the 2016 Summer Olympics, where the team was eliminated in the qualification round.

References

Living people
1998 births
Uzbekistani rhythmic gymnasts
Gymnasts at the 2016 Summer Olympics
Olympic gymnasts of Uzbekistan